La Bonne (aka "Corruption") is a 1986 erotic romantic drama directed by Salvatore Samperi starring Florence Guerin and Trine Michelsen.

Plot 
The film takes place in Vicenza in 1956. Anna, a beautiful lawyer's wife, feels abandoned by her husband and grows closer to their maid, Angela.  The maid convinces Anna to try increasingly daring erotic games.

Cast 
 Florence Guérin as Anna
 Trine Michelsen as Angela	
 Cyrus Elias as Giacomo	
 Silvio Anselmo as Mario		
 Benito Artesi 		
 Ida Eccher 		
 Rita Savagnone	
 Lorenzo Lena  		
 Clara Bertuzzo		
 Antonia Cazzola		
 Roberta Orlandi	
 Antonella Ponziani		
 Bruna Simionato

See also
 List of Italian films of 1986

References

External links
 

Italian erotic drama films
1986 films
Films scored by Riz Ortolani
Films set in 1956
Films set in Italy
Italian LGBT-related films
BDSM in films
Lesbian-related films
1986 LGBT-related films
Films directed by Salvatore Samperi
1980s Italian-language films
1980s Italian films